Taman Mini "Indonesia Indah" (literally "Beautiful Indonesia" Mini Park—the apostrophes are in the name—abbreviated as TMII) is a culture-based recreational area located in East Jakarta, Indonesia. Since July 2021, it is operated by PT Taman Wisata Candi Borobudur, Prambanan, dan Ratu Boko, a subsidiary of the state-owned tourism holding company InJourney. It was operated by Yayasan Harapan Kita, a foundation established by Siti Hartinah, the first lady during most of the New Order and wife of Suharto, and run by Suharto's descendants since his death until 2021.

The park is a synopsis of Indonesian culture, with virtually all aspects of daily life in Indonesia's 26 (in 1975) provinces encapsulated in separate pavilions with the collections of rumah adat as the example of Indonesian vernacular architecture, clothing, dances and traditions are all depicted impeccably. The park mainly exhibites the physical culture of the nation. Apart from that, there is a lake with a miniature of the archipelago in the middle of it, cable cars, museums, Keong Emas IMAX cinema (Indonesia's only IMAX cinema until the 2010s), a theater called the Theatre of My Homeland (Theater Tanah Airku) and other recreational facilities which make TMII one of the most popular tourist destinations in the city.

Since 2007 Taman Mini Indonesia Indah launched new logo with branding slogan Pesona Indonesia (Indonesian Charm).

On December 31, 2014, World Peace Committee decided TMII as International Civilization Park and World Peace Theme Park.

History

The idea of presenting Indonesia on a small scale was conceived by former Indonesian first lady, Siti Hartinah, better known as Tien Suharto. It came about at a convention on 8 Cendana Street on March 13, 1970. Through this recreational site, she hoped to cultivate national pride in more Indonesian people. A project called "Indonesian Miniature Project" was started by Harapan Kita Foundation in 1972. The concept of this culture-based recreational area was inspired by Indonesia's unparalleled natural riches and local folk diversity.

Characteristics
TMII was originally located on a public area of 145 ha, as farms and fields. Later, the team was able to convert these fields into a suitable location for the construction. The topography of TMII is rather hilly, consistent with what the builders required. The team claimed the advantage of utilizing this uneven terrain was the ability to create interesting and diverse landscapes and enclosures, as well as reflecting the various characteristics of the Indonesian environment.

Parts of TMII

Venues of Indonesian provinces

Since each Indonesian province maintains its own unique and distinct cultures, shelters, attire and dialects, TMII built a model of each of the houses from Indonesian provinces. TMII attempted not only to reconstruct the homes of the various provinces, but also to create a realistic model of the environment and shelters of the various people of Indonesia. The venues, which are situated around the main lake in a similar fashion to the different islands of the Indonesian archipelago, are thematically divided into six areas in respect to the main islands of Indonesia; Java, Sumatra, Kalimantan (Borneo), Sulawesi, the Lesser Sunda Islands, Maluku and Papua. Each pavilions featured in typical vernacular Indonesian architecture of each provinces. Examples of Indonesian traditional vernacular houses are: Joglo and Omah Kudus Javanese houses of Central Java and Yogyakarta pavilion; Minang Rumah Gadang of West Sumatra pavilion; Malay houses of Jambi and Riau provinces; Torajan Tongkonan and Bugis house of South Sulawesi pavilion; and Balinese house compound with intricately carved candi bentar split gate and kori agung gate.

It also displays various traditional costumes, wedding costumes, dance costumes, also ethnography artifacts such as weapons and daily tools, models of traditional architecture are in display to describes the way of life of its people. Each provinces pavilions also equipped with small stage, amphitheatre or auditorium for traditional dance performances, traditional music performances or traditional ceremonies that usually held in Sundays. Some of these pavilions also equipped with cafeterias featuring traditional Indonesian cuisines and also souvenir shops offering various handicrafts, T-shirts and souvenirs.

Since 1975 until the 2000s, the original design of TMII consists of a model of the traditional houses (rumah adat) from the 27 provinces of Indonesia, including East Timor. But after the secession of East Timor from Indonesia in 2002, the East Timor pavilion changed its status to become the Museum of East Timor. Since Indonesia now consists of 34 provinces, the new province pavilions of Bangka Belitung, Banten, West Sulawesi, North Maluku, Gorontalo, Riau Islands, and West Papua has been built in northeast part of the park, although the size and area of the newly built pavilions is much smaller than the previously built pavilions.

After the recognition of Indonesian Chinese culture as an integral part of Indonesian culture in 2000, the new Indonesian Chinese pavilion and a Confucian temple was built within the park.

Religious buildings
The religious buildings of several official faiths is meant to showcase the inter-faiths tolerance and religious harmony of Indonesia. The religious buildings are:
 Pangeran Diponegoro Mosque
 Santa Catharina Catholic church
 Haleluya Protestant church
 Penataran Agung Kertabhumi Balinese Hindu temple
 Arya Dwipa Arama Buddhist temple
 Sasana Adirasa Pangeran Samber Nyawa
 Kong Miao Confucian temple

Gardens and parks

There are about ten gardens spread within TMII complex, but most are located primarily on the north and northeast side of the main lake:
 Orchid Garden
 Medicinal herbs Garden
 Cactus Garden
 Jasmine Garden
 Keong Emas (Golden Snail) Flower Garden
 Taman Ria Atmaja Park, stage and music performances
 Taman Budaya Tionghoa Indonesia, an Indonesian Chinese cultural park (under construction)

Taman Burung (Bird Park) 
Taman Burung is divided into five exhibits: Kubah barat (West dome) which include birds from the Greater Sunda Islands (Except Sulawesi) and the Lesser Sunda Islands, kubah timur (East dome) which include birds from Sulawesi, the Maluku Islands, and New Guinea, a free ranging river exhibits, raptor aviaries, and other aviaries and exhibits scattered around the park. The park also own several birds from outside of Indonesia, such as birds from China, Africa, Australia, and South America.

Museum Serangga
Museum Serangga is invertebrates museum that have collections from around Southeast Asia. The Museum also have live insect exhibits, and small mammal park. The museum also have a breeding facility on certain type of butterfly.

Dunia Air Tawar
Dunia Air Tawar is the second largest freshwater and brackish themed aquarium in Asia. The aquarium has over 6000 animals from 126 species, including reptiles, amphibian, crustaceans, and fish.

Taman Legenda
A dinosaur and Indonesian folklore themed park.

Technological Centre
Pusat peragaan Iptek or Science and Technology Display Centre is under coordination of Research and Technology Ministry. At the end of 2011 has 15 sites with about 300 science tools and visited by 341,000 visitor in a year. The sites are Robotic, Electric and Magnet, Mechanics, Mathematics, etc.

Museums

There are fourteen museums at TMII:
 Indonesia Museum
 Purna Bhakti Pertiwi Museum
 Soldier Museum
 Indonesian stamps Museum
 Pusaka (Heirloom) Museum
 Transportation Museum
 Museum Electricity & New Energy Museum
 Telecommunication Museum
 Penerangan Museum
 Sports Museum
 Asmat Museum
 Komodo Indonesian Fauna Museum and Reptile Park
 Insects Museum
 Research & Technology Information Centre
 Oil & Gas Museum
 East Timor Museum (former East Timor province pavilion)

Theatres
 Keong Emas (Golden Snail) Imax Theater
 Tanah Airku Theater
 4D Theater

Monuments, halls, buildings and other exhibits

 Kala Makara main gates
 Flower clock
 Tugu Api Pancasila, the main monument, an obelisk celebrating Pancasila
 Baluwerti, a twin gate with relief of Indonesian history on its wall
 Pendopo Agung Sasono Utomo (Grand Hall), the main building in Javanese Joglo style
 Sasono Utomo, exhibition hall
 Sasono Langen Budoyo, indoor stage and theater
 Sasono Manganti
 Sasana Kriya, multi purpose function hall
 Park Management Office
 Cokot Sculpture, a display of wooden sculptures by Cokot, a famous Balinese artist
 The Miniature of Borobudur
 APEC Memorial Monument and Garden
 Non Alignment Nations Friendship Monument and Garden
 The Miniature of Indonesian Archipelago on central lake
 Indonesian Archipelago Plaza and Stage
 Jati Taminah, a remnant of a large teak tree
 Kayu Gede (large wood), the display of large tree trunk

Rides

 Skylift Indonesia cable car
 SHS-23 Aeromovel Indonesia, a wind powered people mover
 Mini train around the park (Permanently Closed)
 Boat ride on Indonesian archipelago lake
 Swan paddle boat on Indonesian archipelago lake
 Bicycle rent ride
 Car ride around the area

Recreation facilities

 Istana Anak-Anak Indonesia (Indonesian Children Castle)
 Taman Among Putro kiddy rides park
 Desa Seni dan Kerajinan handicraft center
 Rare books market
 Snowbay Waterpark swimming pool
 Telaga Mina fishing pond
 Warna Alam outbound camp

Lodgings
 Desa Wisata hostel
 Graha Wisata Remaja youth hostel

Restaurants
 Caping Gunung restaurant
 California Fried Chicken restaurants
Pecel Madiun restaurant
 Various cafeterias and warungs available throughout the park featuring Indonesian cuisines such as soto, gado-gado, nasi goreng and satay.

Plans
 the operator planned to disburse $35 million for building a new Discovery World theme park. A 2-hectare area was to be built and it was predicted to be operated before the end of 2012. It would serve 100 venues/rides and was predicted to attract 1.2 million visitors from Indonesia and Southeast Asia.

TMII area would be connected with Taman Mini Station of Greater Jakarta LRT Line 1, which is currently under construction.

Gallery

Sources

External links

 Official website

 
Amusement parks in Indonesia
Parks and lakes in Jakarta
Buildings and structures in Jakarta
Open-air museums in Indonesia
Post-independence architecture of Indonesia
Tourist attractions in Jakarta
Museums in Jakarta
1975 establishments in Indonesia
Cultural centers in Indonesia
InJourney